Bikini Daze is the debut extended play (EP) by Danish singer and songwriter MØ. It was released on 18 October 2013 by Chess Club Records and RCA Victor. The EP was made available as a digital download and as a limited-edition 10-inch vinyl.

Track listing
All lyrics written by Karen Marie Ørsted. All music composed by Ronni Vindahl and Ørsted, except "XXX 88" by Diplo, Vindahl and Ørsted. All tracks produced by Vindahl, except "XXX 88" by Diplo and Vindahl.

Charts

Release history

References

2013 debut EPs
MØ albums
Albums produced by Diplo
RCA Victor EPs